The Netherlands participated at the Junior Eurovision Song Contest 2009, which took place in Kyiv, Ukraine. Ralf Mackenbach represented the country with the song "Click Clack".

Before Junior Eurovision

Junior Songfestival 2009 
AVRO held a national final to select the Dutch entry for the contest. The contest consists of two semi-finals and one final. Each semi-final had 5 songs, with 2 advancing to the final: one more entry qualified to the final as a wildcard entry, allowing 5 songs to compete in the final.

The submission period for songs for the competition was from 1 February to 10 April. Over 1000 entries were received by AVRO for the contest, which were initially reduced to 100 entries. This was followed by 33 entries being selected to participate in auditions in Baarn, where the final 10 act were selected.

The names of the 10 successful entries that qualified to the live shows were released on 2 June 2009. The artists collaborated on a theme song for the competition, "Morgen is vandaag" (Tomorrow is today), which was included on the compilation CD, alongside the 10 competing songs, available in September, and was performed in both semi-finals and the final.

Semi-final 1

Semi-final 2

Final

At Junior Eurovision

Voting

Notes

References

External links 
  AVRO website

Netherlands
Junior Eurovision Song Contest
2009